The Fairchild Group is a Canadian business conglomerate headquartered in Vancouver, British Columbia, Canada. Fairchild Group operates various media properties under the Fairchild Media Group name. Fairchild currently operates the Cantonese channel Fairchild TV, Cantonese & Mandarin radio network Fairchild Radio, and Mandarin channel Talentvision. Fairchild Group is also involved in film production, real estate development, retail, telecommunications and wholesale trade.

History
The Fairchild Media Group acquired the Canadian Radio-television and Telecommunications Commission (CRTC) broadcasting licence from Chinavision Canada and Cathay TV in 1993 to form Fairchild TV and Talentvision respectively. Later on, it formed Fairchild Radio with stations in Vancouver, Calgary and Toronto.  It has an investment portfolio over US$350 million.

The company's corporate headquarters are located in Vancouver, British Columbia with separate regional offices in Richmond Hill, Ontario and Calgary, Alberta.

Ownership
The Fairchild Group is mostly owned by Hong Kong-born Canadian businessman Thomas Fung Wing Fat. However, the Hong Kong-based media company TVB has a minor stake of 20 percent.

Coverage
 80% Cantonese
 20% Mandarin

Fairchild Media Group

Television

Fairchild Group operates four national ethnic television channels that cater to both Cantonese & Mandarin speaking audiences- Fairchild TV, Fairchild TV 2 HD & Talentvision. Hong Kong broadcaster TVB owns a minority stake (20%) in both channels.

Fairchild TV and Talentvision currently consists of five feeds:

 Fairchild TV Calgary (Cantonese)
 Fairchild TV Toronto (Cantonese and Mandarin)
 Fairchild TV Vancouver (Cantonese)
 Fairchild TV 2 HD (Cantonese)
 Talentvision Vancouver (Mandarin)

Radio

Fairchild Group operates four multicultural radio stations and shares programming on another station. All stations feature programming for both Cantonese- and Mandarin-speaking audiences:
 Fairchild Radio Calgary: CHKF-FM/94.7 (Cantonese and Mandarin broadcast)
 Fairchild Radio Toronto: CHKT/1430 (Cantonese and Mandarin broadcast)
 Fairchild Radio Vancouver: CJVB/1470 & CHKG-FM/96.1 (Cantonese and Mandarin broadcast)

Fairchild is jointly provides Chinese programming at AM1540 with newspaper operator Sing Tao (Toronto). The station is still owned by CHIN Radio/TV International, while Sing Tao is jointly owned by Torstar and Sing Tao News Corporation of Hong Kong. Some AM1540 radio personalities from the FM station of Fairchild Radio Toronto have been transferred to this new AM station.

In October 2019, Fairchild Radio gained public attention when it fired a Toronto talk-show host allegedly because of his questions during an interview perceived as critical of the Chinese government's stance on the 2019–2020 Hong Kong protests.

Film production
Fairchild Group operates Fairchild Films International Limited, a motion picture production company that creates Chinese language films for international audiences.

The company has produced one film, Paper Moon Affair, in 2005.

Real estate development and management
 Aberdeen Centre, Richmond, B.C. – One of the many Asian shopping malls in the Golden Village district.
 Aberdeen Residence, Richmond, B.C. – A residential complex attached to Aberdeen Centre.
 Aberdeen Square, Richmond, B.C. – A new shopping mall and office tower completed in 2014, that will be attached to Aberdeen Centre and Aberdeen Residence.
 English Bay Village, Vancouver, B.C.
 Fairchild Square, Vancouver, B.C. – New FMG headquarters and office tower.

Retail

All retail operations are in British Columbia other than Oomomo and St Germain Bakery (British Columbia and Ontario):

 Saint Germain Bakery – Chinese bakery (1986)
 Aberdeen Post Office
 Racing Devils Hobbies – Hobby store
 Smart Living Design – Home furniture store
 Smart Office Furniture – Office furniture store
 A Light Idea – Lighting retail store
 Memory Collection – Gift shop
 Living Colors – Modern home & kitchenware store
 aR Fashion – Fashion retailer
 Ozone Fashion – Fashion retailer
 Gado Gado Fashion – Men's fashion retailer
 Gibson Travel Accessories – Luggage / backpack / Travel accessories
 IT Power – Computer Retail / service store
 Menji Stationery Store – Stationery retailer
 Impulse Sports – Sporting Equipment Retailer
 Super Garage – Auto accessories
 Party Goodies – Party supply retailer
 Pot and Plant- Artificial floral retailer
 Pot Arts – Closed
 Timbuktu Military Surplus & Apparel – Military Surplus & Apparel retailer – Closed
 Voodoo Palace – Voodoo dolls retailer
 Bike Stop – Closed
 Giordano
 Santayaya 
 Planet Food
 7th Heaven Cafe – Closed
 Ajijiman
 Hanabi
 Bean Factory
 Frappe Bliss
 Hainanese Chicken
 David and Goliath
 Oomomo – Dollar store

Trading
 Hutchison Imports has extensive wholesale and distribution interests in general merchandise, dollar store items, toys, RC hobby, sports, apparel, furniture, consumer and lifestyle products. The company works with manufacturers and suppliers all over the world to source out products for the North American market.

Hutchison Imports has its own brand – "Menji".  Menji products are fast becoming a staple on many dollar/discount store shelves.

Telecommunications

Fairchild Group operates various online, internet-based businesses:

 eSeeNet.com Ltd.- A business solutions company, founded in 1995
 eSeeHosting- Web hosting provider
 Lynx Communications- Internet service provider, based in Richmond, British Columbia

Foreign investment
Stone Group – a pharmaceutical firm in China via Fairchild Investments Ltd.

See also
 Chinese Canadians in British Columbia

References

External links
 
 CRTC chart of Fairchild Group's radio assets (PDF)
 CRTC chart of Fairchild Group's TV assets (PDF)

Chinese-language mass media in Canada
Chinese-language radio stations
Companies based in Vancouver
Film production companies of Canada
Radio stations in Vancouver
Real estate companies of Canada
Television broadcasting companies of Canada